Estadio José Zorrilla was a multi-use stadium in Valladolid, Spain. It was initially used as the stadium for Real Valladolid matches. The first match took place on 3 November 1940 with a 4–1 win over Arenas Club de Getxo. The capacity of the stadium was 18,000 spectators, although this was extended for the last game of the  1980–81 season to 22,000 with the use of temporary seating for a match against Real Madrid. It was replaced by the current Estadio José Zorrilla in 1982, although the reserve team, Real Valladolid B, carried on using the ground until 1984. 

The stadium was finally demolished in 1987. The site is now occupied by a branch of the El Corte Inglés department store.

References

External links
Stadium history 
Estadios de Espana 

Real Valladolid
Sports venues in Valladolid
Jose Zorrilla
1940 establishments in Spain
1984 disestablishments in Spain
Sports venues completed in 1940
Sports venues demolished in 1987